The Abdul Latif Jameel Poverty Action Lab (J-PAL) is a global research center working to reduce poverty by ensuring that policy is informed by scientific evidence. J-PAL conducts randomized impact evaluations to answer critical questions in the fight against poverty, and builds partnerships with governments, NGOs, donors, and others to generate new research, share knowledge, and scale up effective programs.

History and mission

J-PAL was founded in 2003 as the "Poverty Action Lab" by professors Abhijit Banerjee, Esther Duflo and Sendhil Mullainathan. J-PAL was established to support randomized evaluations measuring interventions against poverty on topics ranging from agriculture and health to governance and education. The Lab was renamed in honor of Sheikh Abdul Latif Jameel when his son, MIT alumnus Mohammed Abdul Latif Jameel, supported it with three major endowments in 2005. He further endowed its activities in 2009.

A 2010 Business Week story, "The Pragmatic Rebels", termed J-PAL's approach that of "a new breed of skeptical empiricists committed to assiduous testing and tangible results". According to Nicolas Kristof, J-PAL has led a "revolution in evaluation"; its philosophy and methods are part of a larger trend towards "applying behavioral economics to global development." In his review of Banerjee and Duflo's book Poor Economics, Bill Gates wrote: "To me, what's really great about J-PAL is that it's producing scientific evidence that can help make our anti-poverty efforts more effective."

Activities
Although J-PAL was founded as a research center, its activities have expanded to encompass three areas: impact evaluations, policy outreach, and capacity building.

To date, a network of over 170 J-PAL affiliated professors has carried out more than 948 evaluations in 81 countries, and J-PAL has trained over 1,500 people in impact evaluation. These evaluations include everything from an analysis of the effectiveness of glasses in China in improving student test scores to a study on the value of deworming to improve student attendance and academic performance in Kenya. This work, by Michael Kremer and Edward Miguel, provided the impetus for the Deworm the World initiative, which has since reached over 20 million children. Another J-PAL researcher, Nava Ashraf, recently completed work on innovative channels to ease the load of overburdened health care workers in Zambia. An evaluation in India by J-PAL Directors Esther Duflo, Abhijit Banerjee, and Rachel Glennerster, together with Dhruva Kothari, found that full immunization rates increased dramatically with the introduction of small incentives for parents, coupled with reliable services at convenient mobile clinics.

As part of its capacity-building efforts, J-PAL offers courses to help implementers, policymakers, and researchers become better producers and users of evidence and equip learners worldwide with skills in data analysis and economics. Offerings include open enrollment courses, custom workshops, online courses, and trainings for research staff. J-PAL has created an online MicroMasters credential in cooperation with MITx and a Diploma in Impact Evaluation with Pontificia Universidad Católica de Chile. In 2019, J-PAL launched the blended MIT Master's in Data, Economics, and Development Policy, combining online learning with residential education at MIT and intensive internships. The master's program will equip outstanding students with the skills they need to create evidence-based change in their communities.

Structure
J-PAL's headquarters (Global office) is a center within the Economics Department of the Massachusetts Institute of Technology (MIT), with regional offices in Africa, Europe, Latin America, North America, South Asia, and Southeast Asia that are hosted by a local university:
 J-PAL Europe (Paris, France), established in 2007 with the Paris School of Economics
 J-PAL South Asia (Chennai, India), established in 2007 with the Institute for Financial Management and Research
 J-PAL Latin America and Caribbean (Santiago, Chile), established in 2009 with the Pontifícia Universidad Católica
 J-PAL Africa (Cape Town, South Africa), established in 2011 with the University of Cape Town at SALDRU
 J-PAL Southeast Asia (Jakarta, Indonesia), based at the Institute for Economic and Social Research within the Faculty of Economics at the University of Indonesia (LPEM FEB-UI)
 J-PAL North America (Cambridge, Massachusetts), established in 2013 with the Massachusetts Institute of Technology

J-PAL is organized both by these regional offices and by research themes called sector programs. Programs are led by members of the organization's board of directors, and cover eight areas:
 Agriculture
 Crime
 Education
 Energy and Environment
 Finance
 Health
 Labor Markets
 Political Economy & Governance

J-PAL is currently led by Professors Abhijit Banerjee, Esther Duflo and Ben Olken as Faculty Directors and Iqbal Dhaliwal as the Global Executive Director. J-PAL's Board of Directors sets the vision and strategy for the organization and includes the Global Directors and executive director, Regional Scientific Directors and executive directors, and Chairs of the Sector Programs. In 2019, J-PAL co-founders Abhijit Banerjee and Esther Duflo, and long time research affiliate Michael Kremer were awarded the Nobel prize in economics "for their experimental approach to alleviating global poverty."

Partnerships

Innovations for Poverty Action (IPA) is a close partner of the Abdul Latif Jameel Poverty Action Lab (J-PAL). The two organizations share a common mission and take similar methodological approaches to development policy evaluation, though J-PAL works through universities and makes use of academic resources, while IPA, as a nonprofit, operates through country offices. Both organizations have pioneered the use of randomized evaluations to study the effectiveness of development interventions worldwide and have collaborated extensively on field studies involving randomized evaluations. A number of J-PAL Affiliates are also IPA Research Affiliates or IPA Research Network Members. The work of both organizations is featured in the popular press books More Than Good Intentions by Dean Karlan and Jacob Appel, and in Banerjee and Duflo's 2011 book, Poor Economics, which was chosen as the 2011 Financial Times and Goldman Sachs Business Book of the Year Award.

Other J-PAL research partners include the Centre for Micro Finance, Harvard Kennedy School's Center for International Development's Micro-Development Initiative, the Center of Evaluation for Global Action, Ideas 42, Educate!, and the Small Enterprise Finance Center.

Experiments and findings in India
J-PAL has conducted extensive work in India. Below are some examples of experiments and findings in India:
 Teaching at the Right Level: J-PAL-affiliated researchers partnered with the organization Pratham to conduct numerous randomized evaluations of their Teaching at the Right Level (TaRL) approach. The research shows that TaRL consistently improves learning when implemented well.
 AP Smartcards: Assessed impact of Smartcards on leakages in MGNREGS and social security pensions in AP and found that it reduced time taken by beneficiaries to receive payments, reduced leakages, and increased user satisfaction.
 Haryana Schools: Experimented with teaching students at their actual learning levels, rather than the grade they are in. Such students did better at Hindi but no better at maths.
 Bihar MGNREGA: Conducted 12 districts and is testing impact on payment delays and corruption in a new official system of funds release.
 Rajasthan Police: Conducted between 2005 and 2008, the study involved sending decoys to police stations with fictitious complaints, and analyzing how many cases were actually registered, as well as how policing could be improved.
 Delhi Deworming: Conducted in 2001–02, showed giving iron, vitamin A supplements and deworming drugs to 2- to 6-year-old children through balwadis greatly increased their weight and school participation.
 Udaipur Absent Teachers: In 2003, showed how financial incentives and fines increased teacher attendance, leading to improved learning outcomes for students.
 Gujarat Pollution Auditing: Experimented with third party pollution audits of industrial firms paid for by a central pool, instead of by the firm itself; found that such independently paid for auditors reported higher levels of pollution.
 Nurse Attendance: Showed monitoring nurses attendance and fining them for absenteeism led to dramatic improvement in attendance until local administration undermined the scheme.

Awards
 2008: J-PAL receives BBVA Foundation Frontiers of Knowledge Award for Development Cooperation
 2009: Abhijit Banerjee receives inaugural Infosys Prize
 2010: Esther Duflo and Sendhil Mullainathan named among Foreign Policy's Top 100 Global Thinkers
 2010: Esther Duflo receives John Bates Clark Medal
 2010: Erica Field receives Elaine Bennett Research Prize
 2011: Poor Economics chosen as Financial Times and Goldman Sachs Business Book of the Year Award.
 2014: J-PAL, Abhijit Banerjee, and Esther Duflo awarded The Social Science Research Council's Albert O. Hirschman Prize
 1997, 2002, 2009: The MacArthur Foundation awarded grants to Esther Duflo (2009), Sendhil Mullainathan (2002), and Michael Kremer (1997)
 2019: Sveriges Riksbank Prize in Economic Sciences in Memory of Alfred Nobel has been awarded to Abhijit Banerjee, Esther Duflo and Michael Kremer "for their experimental approach to alleviating global poverty."

References

External links 
 Abdul Latif Jameel Poverty Action Lab
 Innovations for Poverty Action

Massachusetts Institute of Technology
Economic research institutes
2003 establishments in Massachusetts
Organizations established in 2003
Research on poverty